Begonia solimutata (or Begonia soli-mutata), the sun-changing begonia, is a species of flowering plant in the family Begoniaceae, native to Pará state in northern Brazil. It has gained the Royal Horticultural Society's Award of Garden Merit.

References

solimutata
Endemic flora of Brazil
Flora of Pará
Plants described in 1990